Jake Steven Cain (born 2 September 2001) is an English footballer who plays as a midfielder for Swindon Town.

He signed his first professional contract with Liverpool F.C. in September 2019 and made his senior Liverpool debut on 4 February 2020 in the FA Cup fourth-round replay against Shrewsbury Town which they won 1-0. He joined Swindon in January 2023, signing a two-and-a-half year contract.

Career

Liverpool 
Cain made his first-team debut on 4 February 2020, in the FA Cup fourth round replay against Shrewsbury Town. On 29 September 2020, Cain scored his first senior goal in a 3–2 EFL Trophy defeat to Tranmere Rovers, scoring an impressive thirty-yard free kick.

Newport County (loan)
On 31 August 2021, Cain joined League Two side Newport County on loan for the 2021–22 season. He made his debut for Newport the same day in the starting line-up for the 2-0 win against Plymouth Argyle in the EFL Trophy. He made his football league debut for Newport on 14 September 2021 in starting line-up for the 1-0 League Two defeat against Northampton Town.

Swindon Town
He joined Swindon on 16 January, 2023 signing a two-and-a-half year contract with the Wiltshire club. He made his first league start for Swindon on February 4, 2023 against Newport County, that also marked the first league match in charge of Swindon for new manager Jody Morris.

Career statistics

Club

Honours
Liverpool
 FA Youth Cup: 2018–19

References

2001 births
Living people
Association football midfielders
English footballers
Footballers from Wigan
Liverpool F.C. players
Newport County A.F.C. players
Swindon Town F.C. players